The Beaverton Health & Science School was a public school in the U.S. state of Oregon. Part of the Beaverton School District (BSD), the school offered grades 6 through 12. Opened in 2007, the school was housed in the Capital Center at 185th Avenue and Walker Road in Hillsboro. Since the beginning of 2016, the school has been directly adjacent to another BSD option school, the School of Science & Technology, with the relocation of that school to the Capital Center at the end of 2015.
The school hosts a HOSA- Future Health Professionals chapter. For the 2020-2021 school year and onward, this school and the neighboring school, the School of Science and Technology have merged to become the Beaverton Academy of Science and Engineering.

History
The school district started the school in September 2007 with 120 students in ninth grade as an option program, intending to add students each year until it included grades six through twelve. In January 2008, the district purchased the Capital Center from Portland Community College and the Oregon University System for $15 million to serve as the home for the Health & Science School. Plans called for an additional $6 million to be spent remodeling the center for use by the school. The Capital Center was previously a campus of Tektronix that was sold in 1995 to a consortium of local public education entities with plans that included using part of it for a regional high school.

In 2008, the school was one of six district schools that failed to provide enough class time to meet a state mandate.

Three students were arrested on accusations of arson for a fire in a bathroom at the school in April 2011.

Also in 2011, the school was rated as needing improvement by the state after it failed to hold some state mandated tests.

The school was identified as one of several schools that would take students with the closure of Terra Nova High School in 2012.

Female students participated in the Hermanas Conference sponsored by Intel Corporation in February 2013.

In 2016, the School of Science and Technology (SST), an accredited high school initially located beside Merlo High School, moved next door to the Health and Science school to occupy the 2 left-most side halls of the campus.  Student attending classes at SST had the option of taking crossover classes with HS2.  

In 2019, it was decided by the district that due to limited budgeting, SST and HS2 would merge to become one entity known as the Beaverton Academy of Science and Engineering, thus making the 2019-2020 school-year the last year that the two schools would be officially separate entities.  From 2020-2021 and onward, the school was officially recognized as BASE, dawning new colors, blue and gold, and a new mascot, a Phoenix.

Academics
Health & Science School is an option school; students opt out of their neighborhood school and are entered into a lottery for one of the limited spots at the school. As of 2013 it had an achievement index rating from the state of 56 and a rating of below average. Enrollment for the 2012 to 2013 school year was 687 students.

The high school adheres to a rigorous dual credit program that is incorporated into the Expeditionary Learning curriculum.  Students have the opportunity to earn college credit in math, biomedical science, engineering, foreign language and science courses through OIT (Oregon Institute of Technology), PCC (Portland Community College) and PSU (Portland State University).

External links
 Official site

References
14. "SST and HS2 Merging Into A New School" About Us.

High schools in Washington County, Oregon
Public middle schools in Oregon
Alternative schools in Oregon
Schools in Hillsboro, Oregon
Public high schools in Oregon
Beaverton School District
2007 establishments in Oregon
Educational institutions established in 2007